Trent Jordan Ostler (born 3 April 2002), is an Australian professional football player who plays as an attacking midfielder for Perth Glory.

Club career 
On 7 August 2019, Ostler made his competitive debut for Perth Glory, in a 2–1 extra time loss to Western Sydney Wanderers in the FFA Cup.

References

2002 births
Living people
Perth Glory FC players
Australian soccer players
Association football forwards